Gamble Creek is a stream in Manatee County, Florida, in the United States.

Gamble Creek derives its name from Major Robert Gamble, Jr.

See also
List of rivers of Florida

References

Rivers of Manatee County, Florida
Rivers of Florida